Chen Guohua, born Tan Kok Hwa, is a Singaporean actor and contracted artiste under MediaCorp.

Career
Chen graduated from the Singapore Broadcasting Corporation 5th Year Artiste Training Class. He was trained by veteran theatrical teachers such as Mao Wei, Li Yongxi, Zhu Bingquan and Xia Chuan. Chen was cast in his debut role in the long-running TV series Neighbours in 1986. He won the Best Supporting Actor award twice at the Star Awards in 1998 and 2000.

Filmography

Film

Television

Accolades

References

20th-century Singaporean male actors
Living people
Singaporean people of Hokkien descent
21st-century Singaporean male actors
Singaporean male television actors
Year of birth missing (living people)